Phycitodes saxicola, the small clouded knot-horn, is a species of snout moth described by Vaughan in 1870. It is found in most of Europe (except Poland, Ukraine and the western part of the Balkan Peninsula), as well as Iran, Morocco and the Canary Islands.

The wingspan is 12–19 mm. Adults are on wing from June to August in one generation per year.

The larvae feed on the flower heads of various Asteraceae species, including  Achillea millefolium, Senecio (such as Senecio jacobaea), Anthemis, Jasione and Tanacetum species.

References

Moths described in 1870
Phycitini
Moths of Europe
Moths of Asia